Garrett Morehead was a college football player for the North Carolina Tar Heels, captain of the 1927 team, and selected All-Southern.

References

American football tackles
North Carolina Tar Heels football players
All-Southern college football players